Stefano Mengozzi (born ) is an Italian male volleyball player. He is part of the Italy men's national volleyball team. On club level he plays for Robur Porto.

Sporting achievements

Clubs

FIVB Club World Championship
  Brazil 2022 – with Sir Safety Susa Perugia

National championships
 2022/2023  Italian Super Cup, with Sir Safety Susa Perugia

References

External links
 profile at FIVB.org

1985 births
Living people
Italian men's volleyball players
Place of birth missing (living people)